Wu Ching-ji (born 15 June 1951) is a Taiwanese educator. He was the Minister of the Education from 2009 to 2012.

Education
Wu obtained his doctoral degree in education from National Taiwan Normal University.

Political career
Wu was the Administrative Vice Minister of Education in the Executive Yuan in 1999-2000 and the Political Vice Minister in 2000. In 2000–2001, he was the director of the preparatory office of the National Academy for Educational Research. He became the Deputy Mayor of Taipei City Government in 2008, and was back again at the Ministry of Education as Minister from 2009 to 2012.

References

Taiwanese Ministers of Education
Living people
1951 births